Bolshenabatovsky is a rural locality (a khutor) in Golubinskoye Rural Settlement, Kalachyovsky District, Volgograd Oblast, Russia. The population was 76 as of 2010.

Geography 
Bolshenabatovsky is located in steppe, on Yergeny, 50 km north of Kalach-na-Donu (the district's administrative centre) by road. Malogolubinsky is the nearest rural locality.

References 

Rural localities in Kalachyovsky District